Vaneli is a village in the Java District of South Ossetia or Shida Kartli, Georgia. The village is the center of the eponymous community consisting of 12 villages. It is located on the right bank of Greater Liakhvi river, at an altitude of 1,310 m. Distance to the municipality center Java is 18 km.

Notes

References 

Populated places in Dzau District